Auriglobus is a genus of freshwater pufferfishes native to Southeast Asia. The different Auriglobus species are very similar in appearance — greenish-golden or yellowish-golden above and pale below — but can be separated by morphometrics and meristics. Until 1999, the Auriglobus species were included in Chonerhinos.<ref name=kott1999>Kottelat, M., (1999). Nomenclature of the genera Barbodes, Cyclocheilichthys, Rasbora and Chonerhinos (Teleostei: Cyprinidae and Tetraodontidae), with comments on the definition of the first reviser. The Raffles Bulletin of Zoology 47(2): 591-600.</ref>

Species
There are five recognized species in this genus:

 Auriglobus amabilis (T. R. Roberts, 1982)
 Auriglobus modestus (Bleeker, 1850) (bronze puffer or golden puffer)
 Auriglobus nefastus (T. R. Roberts, 1982) (greenbottle pufferfish)
 Auriglobus remotus (T. R. Roberts, 1982)
 Auriglobus silus'' (T. R. Roberts, 1982)

References 

Tetraodontidae
Freshwater fish genera
Taxa named by Maurice Kottelat